Christopher Verdell Singleton (born August 15, 1972) is a sportscaster and former American professional baseball outfielder. He played for the Chicago White Sox (1999-), Baltimore Orioles, Oakland Athletics and Tampa Bay Devil Rays (2005). During his playing career, his listed height and weight were 6'2", 210 pounds. He batted and threw left-handed.

Baseball career
Selected by the Houston Astros in the 30th round (790th overall) of the 1990 Major League Baseball Draft, Singleton opted to attend the University of Nevada. His stock rose considerably over the next three years, and he was selected by the San Francisco Giants in the 2nd round (48th overall) of the 1993 Major League Baseball Draft. On November 11, he was traded by the Giants with pitcher Alberto Castillo to the New York Yankees for Charlie Hayes and cash. On December 8, 1998, the Yankees dealt him to the White Sox for minor leaguer Rich Pratt.

Upon reaching the majors in 1999, Singleton hit .300 with 17 home runs and 74 RBI, but his power numbers dropped precipitously each season thereafter. A highlight of his 1999 season was on July 6, when he hit for the cycle becoming the first White Sox player to hit for the cycle in 15 years. On January 29, 2002, he was traded by the White Sox to the Baltimore Orioles for Willie Harris.

The team cited a pre-existing ear condition, which had initially been diagnosed as a simple infection, but ultimately proved to be something more serious. On January 21, he signed with the Tampa Bay Devil Rays, but was released on July 4 after just 59 at-bats.

Singleton trained at EVO Ultrafit in Phoenix, Arizona, throughout his career.

Broadcasting career
However, on March 4, it was announced that he would be leaving that position to take on an analyst role with the ESPN television program Baseball Tonight. He was replaced by former Chicago Cubs television broadcaster Steve Stone. In 2021 he was hired as a part-time analyst for Milwaukee Brewers telecasts on Bally Sports Wisconsin.

Personal life 
Singleton is not related to former MLB player Ken Singleton, though Chris was often mistaken for being Ken's son during his career. When Chris Singleton was on the Orioles, he chose to wear the same number 29 that Ken Singleton wore during his career as an Oriole.

Singleton is an ordained minister.

See also
 List of Major League Baseball players to hit for the cycle

References

External links

 

1972 births
Living people
African-American baseball players
African-American Christians
Baltimore Orioles players
Baseball players from California
Chicago White Sox announcers
Chicago White Sox players
Columbus Clippers players
Durham Bulls players
Everett Giants players
Major League Baseball broadcasters
Major League Baseball center fielders
Milwaukee Brewers announcers
Nevada Wolf Pack baseball players
Nevada Wolf Pack football players
Oakland Athletics players
People from Martinez, California
Phoenix Firebirds players
San Jose Giants players
Shreveport Captains players
Tampa Bay Devil Rays players